|}

The Prix d'Arenberg is a Group 3 flat horse race in France open to two-year-old thoroughbreds. It is run at Chantilly over a distance of 1,100 metres (about 5½ furlongs), and it is scheduled to take place each year in September.

History
The event was established in 1911, and it was originally called the Prix des Coteaux. It was initially contested over 1,100 metres at Longchamp. It was abandoned throughout World War I, with no running from 1914 to 1919. It was shortened to 1,000 metres in 1921.

The race was renamed in memory of Auguste d'Arenberg (1837–1924), a long-serving member of the Société d'Encouragement, in 1925.

The Prix d'Arenberg was cancelled once during World War II, in 1939. It was run at Auteuil over 900 metres in 1940, Maisons-Laffitte in 1943 and Le Tremblay in 1944.

The event was transferred to Chantilly in 1975, and it returned to Longchamp in 1983. It was extended to 1,100 metres in 1994, and from this point its venue frequently changed. For brief spells it was held at Maisons-Laffitte (1994, 2002–03), Chantilly  (1995, 1997, 1999–2001) and Évry (1996). It was cancelled because of budget cuts in 1998.

The Prix d'Arenberg moved back to Chantilly in 2004. It was staged at Maisons-Laffitte in 2010 and 2011 and Longchamp in 2015 over the shorter distance of 5 furlongs.

Records
Leading jockey (6 wins):
 Yves Saint-Martin – Texanita (1963), Farhana (1966), Zeddaan (1967), Hawkins (1977), Adraan (1979), Last Tycoon (1985)
 Freddy Head – Enitram (1972), Sigy (1978), Greenway (1980), Sicyos (1983), Doree (1994) Pas de Reponse (1996)

Leading trainer (9 wins):
 Criquette Head-Maarek – Sigy (1978), Sicyos (1983), Ravinella (1987), Divine Danse (1990), Key of Luck (1993), Doree (1994), Pas de Reponse (1996), Iron Mask (2000), Villadolide (2003)

Leading owner (5 wins):
 Marcel Boussac – Xander (1927), Djerba (1946, dead-heat), Damnos (1947), Cardanil (1949), Djelfa (1950)

Winners since 1979

 Titus Livius finished first in 1995, but he was subsequently disqualified after testing positive for a banned substance.
 The 2020 running took place at Longchamp due to the COVID-19 pandemic

Earlier winners

 1911: Joseline
 1912: Ecouen
 1913: Roselys
 1914–19: no race
 1920: Phusla
 1921: Tahaa
 1922: Epinard
 1923: Heldifann
 1924: Sherry
 1925: Highborn II
 1926: Licteur
 1927: Xander
 1928: La Fayette
 1929: Aude
 1930: Dogaresse
 1931: Timadora
 1932: Spirituelle
 1933: Shining Tor
 1934: Bao Dai
 1935: Mistress Ford
 1936: Ethiopie
 1937: Shrew
 1938: Emir d'Iran
 1939: no race
 1940: La Peri
 1941: Nugget
 1942: Fanatique
 1943: La Rayonne
 1944: Doge
 1945: Sayani
 1946: Djerba / Le Lavandou 1
 1947: Damnos
 1948:
 1949: Cardanil
 1950: Djelfa
 1951: Pomare
 1952: Kobus
 1953: Vamarie
 1954: Reinata
 1955: Polic
 1956: Skindles Hotel
 1957: Texana
 1958: Ginetta
 1959: Barbaresque
 1960: L'Epinay
 1961: Sturdy Man
 1962: Victorian Order
 1963: Texanita
 1964: Polyfoto
 1965: Fantastic Light
 1966: Farhana
 1967: Zeddaan
 1968: Don II
 1969: Mange Tout
 1970: Anna Karenina
 1971: Deep Diver
 1972: Enitram
 1973: La Lambarde
 1974: Raise a Lady
 1975: Diffusion
 1976: Black Sulphur 2
 1977: Hawkins
 1978: Sigy

1 The 1946 race was a dead-heat and has joint winners.2 Haneena finished first in 1976, but she was relegated to second place following a stewards' inquiry.

See also
 List of French flat horse races
 Recurring sporting events established in 1911 – this race is included under its original title, Prix des Coteaux.

References
 France Galop / Racing Post:

 france-galop.com – A Brief History: Prix d'Arenberg.
 galopp-sieger.de – Prix d'Arenberg (ex Prix des Coteaux).
 horseracingintfed.com – International Federation of Horseracing Authorities – Prix d'Arenberg (2016).
 pedigreequery.com – Prix d'Arenberg – Chantilly.

Flat horse races for two-year-olds
Chantilly Racecourse
Horse races in France